Indane-5-sulfonamide is the base structure of indanesulfonamides. Indane-5-sulfonamide is a carbonic anhydrase inhibitor.

Notes
Carbonic anhydrase inhibitors: binding of indanesulfonamides to the human isoform II

Carbonic anhydrase inhibitors
Sulfonamides